Calodyne is a neighbourhood located in the Rivière du Rempart District, northern Mauritius. It lies on the coast of the Indian Ocean.  It forms part of the village council of Grand Gaube.

Populated places in Mauritius